The 2021 Independence Cup also known as Riviera Independence Cup 2021 due to the sponsorship from Riviera. It was the 11th edition of the Independence Cup, the main domestic annual top tier clubs football tournament organized by Bangladesh Football Federation (BFF). The fifteen participants were competed this edition in the tournament.

Dhaka Abahani is the defending champion, having defeated 3–0 goals Bashundhara Kings in the final of the tournament.

Participating teams
The following fifteen teams were  contested in the tournament.

Venue
All matches was held at BSSS Mostafa Kamal Stadium in Dhaka, Bangladesh.
{| class="wikitable" style="text-align:center; margin:0.2em auto;"
|-
! Dhaka
|rowspan="4"| 
|-
|BSSS Mostafa Kamal Stadium
|-
| Capacity: '25,000 
|-
|}

Draw
The draw ceremony of the tournament was held on 23 November 2021 15:00 at 3rd floors of BFF house Motijheel, Dhaka, Bangladesh. There are fifteen teams were divided into four groups. Top two team's from each group will through Knockout stage.

Group summary

Round and dates

Match officials
Referees

 Bitura Barua
 Md Saymoon Hasan Sany
 Md Jalaluddin
 Md Anisur Rahman Sagor
 Md Jasim Akter
 Md Mizanur Rahman
 Md Alamgir Sarkar
 Md Shorab Hossain
 GM Chowdhury Nayan
 Mahmud Zamil Farouqee Nahid

Assistant Referees

 Md Shah Alam
 Sujoy Borua
 Md Nuruzzaman
 Junayed Sharif
 Md Monir Dhali
 Md Mahmudul Hasan Mamun
 Sharifuzzaman Tipu
 Mehedi Hasan Emon
 Md Rasel Mia
 Bayezid Mondol 
 Sheikh Iqbal Alam
 Md Khorshed Islam
 Sheikh Farid

Group stages

Tiebreakers
Teams were ranked according to points (3 points for a win, 1 point for a draw, 0 points for a loss), and if tied on points, the following tie-breaking criteria were applied, in the order given, to determine the rankings.
Points in head-to-head matches among tied teams;
Goal difference in head-to-head matches among tied teams;
Goals scored in head-to-head matches among tied teams;
If more than two teams are tied, and after applying all head-to-head criteria above, a subset of teams are still tied, all head-to-head criteria above are reapplied exclusively to this subset of teams;
Goal difference in all group matches;
Goals scored in all group matches;
Penalty shoot-out if only two teams were tied and they met in the last round of the group;
Disciplinary points (yellow card = 1 point, red card as a result of two yellow cards = 3 points, direct red card = 3 points, yellow card followed by direct red card = 4 points);
Drawing of lots.

Group A

Group B

Group C

Group D

Knockout stage
In the knockout stages, if a match finished goalless at the end of normal playing time, extra time would have been played (two periods of 15 minutes each) and followed, if necessary, by a penalty shoot-out to determine the winner.

Bracket

Quarter-finals

Semi-finals

Final

Winners

Statistics
Goalscorers

 Own goals † Bold Club indicates winner of the match''

References

Independence Cup (Bangladesh)
2021 in Bangladeshi football
2021 Asian domestic association football cups